Cvikov is a town in Česká Lípa District in the Liberec Region of the Czech Republic. It has about 4,500 inhabitants.

Administrative parts
Cvikov is made up of town parts of Cvikov I and Cvikov II, and of villages of Drnovec, Lindava, Naděje, Svitava, Trávník and Záhořín.

Geography
It lies mostly in the Ralsko Uplands. The Boberský Stream flows through the town.

History
The first written mention of Cvikov is from 1352. The settlement was founded in the 13th century. In 1391, it was promoted to a town. In 1634, during the Thirty Years' War, the town was destroyed by fire, then it suffered during the War of the Bavarian Succession (1778). The greatest development of Cvikov occurred in the 19th century, when the town was industrialized.

Demographics

Sights
The landmark of the town is the Church of Saint Elizabeth of Hungary. The original Gothic church was completely rebuilt in 1553–1558, then it was baroque rebuilt into is current form in 1726–1728.

Notable people
Anton Günther (1783–1863), Austrian philosopher
Karl Kreibich (1883–1966), German Bohemian politician

References

External links

Cities and towns in the Czech Republic
Populated places in Česká Lípa District
Lusatian Mountains